The Raghadan Flagpole is a  tall flagpole located in Amman, Jordan. It was built from steel and erected on the grounds of Raghadan Palace at the royal compound of Al-Maquar. The leader of Jordan, King Abdullah II, officially hoisted the country's flag on the flagpole on 10 June 2003. It is illuminated, making it visible at night, and it was also developed to withstand earthquakes and bad weather.

It flies a  flag. Although it is a distinctive landmark, the excessive noise created during high winds has resulted in the flag being lowered during periods of bad weather.

This free-standing flagpole surpassed the previous record-holder, which was located in Abu Dhabi, United Arab Emirates, and had held the record since 2001. The Raghadan Flagpole is  taller than the one located in the United Arab Emirates. In 2004, the flagpole lost its status as world's tallest free–standing flagpole following the construction of the Aqaba Flagpole.

See also
 Aqaba Flagpole
 List of tallest buildings in Amman
 List of towers

References

External links
 http://www.skyscraperpage.com/diagrams/?b10609

Buildings and structures in Amman
Buildings and structures completed in 2003
Flagpoles